Tubastraea micranthus is a species of corals belonging to the family Dendrophylliidae.

The species is found in Indian and Pacific Ocean.

References

Dendrophylliidae
Taxa named by Christian Gottfried Ehrenberg